Ramón Rogelio Latorre de la Cruz (born 1941) is a Chilean biochemist, The winner of Chile's National Prize for Natural Sciences in 2002, he has been recognized for his investigations in the field of the ionic channels of cellular membranes.

Biography 

He studied secondary in the Chilean School Jose Victorino Lastarria. In 1965 he received a biochemist at the School of Chemistry and Pharmacy. In 1969 he received a doctorate in Sciences with a Doctorate in Biology at the University of Chile, being one of the first students of that degree. He later received a scholarship from the National Institute of Health de EE.UU.,and finished work in his laboratory of biophysics of this institution until the year 1972. Returned to Chile and held the position in the Faculty of Sciences of assistant professor. After 1973 Chilean coup d'état, Returned to the EE.UU. and served in the Department of Physiology at Duke University as a visiting scientist. Two years later he worked in the Department of Physiological and Pharmacological Sciences of the University of Chicago as an assistant professor and in 1977 he began to perform his teaching task at the School of Medicine of the University of Harvard.

Returning to his country (Chile), in 1983 he worked in the Faculty of Sciences of the University of Chile as professor of Cellular Physiology. The following year he founded with the physicist Claudio Teitelboim the Center for Scientific Studies of Santiago, Who later moved to Valdivia.

References

External links 
 Ramón Latorre de la Cruz, Universidad de Chile
 La porfía de Latorre, Revista Qué Pasa
 Ramón Latorre Mentes Brillantes, Canal 13 cable

1941 births
Living people
Chilean chemists
Chilean scientists
Biochemists
University of Chile alumni
Foreign associates of the National Academy of Sciences